Nuno Mendes may refer to:

 Nuno Mendes (count) (died 1071), count of Portugal
 Nuno Mendes (chef) (born 1973), Portuguese chef
 Nuno Mendes (footballer, born 1978), Portuguese former football midfielder
 Nuno Mendes (rower) (born 1984), Portuguese rower
 Nuno Mendes (footballer, born 2002), Portuguese football left-back